A kapala is a cup made from a human skull used as a ritual implement.

Kapala may also refer to:

Kapala (genus), a genus of parasitic wasps in the family Eucharitidae
Kapala, Koutiala, a village in the Cercle of Koutiala of the Sikasso Region in Mali
Kapala, Sikasso, a village in the Cercle of Sikasso of the Sikasso Region in Mali
Frederick J. Kapala (born 1950), United States federal judge

See also